John Charles Odurkami (or Odur Kami, or Odur-kami)  is an Anglican bishop in Uganda; he was  Bishop of Lango from 2001 to 2017.

He was appointed as caretaker Bishop of Kumi in 2019.

References

Anglican bishops of Lango
21st-century Anglican bishops in Uganda
Living people
Uganda Christian University alumni
Year of birth missing (living people)
Anglican bishops of Kumi